Rofe is a surname. Notable people with the surname include:

Paul Rofe (disambiguation), multiple people
Dennis Rofe (born 1950), English footballer
Ron Rofe (1914–2003), Australian politician
Stan Rofe (1933–2003), Australian DJ and music news reporter

See also
Rome (surname)